Michele De Pascale (born 20 January 1985 in Cesena) is an Italian politician.

He is a member of the Democratic Party and he was elected Mayor of Ravenna on 21 June 2016. He has also served as President of the Province of Ravenna since 4 August 2016.

See also
2016 Italian local elections
List of mayors of Ravenna

References

External links
 

1985 births
Living people
Mayors of Ravenna
People from Ravenna
Democratic Party (Italy) politicians
Presidents of the Province of Ravenna